53431 is a Greatest Hits compilation by the electro-pop band Swami. The title refers to the numerical spelling of the band's name. This release is a milestone to mark 10 years of the band's existence, and contains the hits and most well known songs from the band's three studio albums, 1999's Desi Nu Skool Beatz, 2004's So Who Am I and 2007's Equalize.

It also contains two new songs "Sugarless" and "Tonight".

Track listing

References

Swami (band) albums
2009 greatest hits albums